The 1998 Florida gubernatorial election was held on November 3, 1998, to determine the Governor for the State of Florida. Two-term Democratic incumbent Governor Lawton Chiles was term-limited and could not run for re-election. John Ellis "Jeb" Bush, who had previously run for governor in 1994 was the Republican nominee, and incumbent Lieutenant Governor Kenneth Hood "Buddy" MacKay was the Democratic nominee. Bush defeated MacKay by nearly 11% of the vote, and won his first of two terms as governor.

Jeb Bush was one of four GOP pickups nationwide in the 1998 gubernatorial elections. Nonetheless, the Republican party still netted a loss of one governorship.

On December 12, 1998, incumbent Governor Lawton Chiles suddenly died of a heart attack, thrusting MacKay into the governor's office, for which he had just lost the election, for 24 days. This was the second election in which MacKay had unsuccessfully run to succeed Chiles in an elected office, the first being the 1988 Senate race.

Candidates

Democratic
Buddy MacKay, incumbent Lieutenant Governor of Florida

Republican
Jeb Bush, Businessman, 1994 Republican nominee for governor, and Grandson of Former U.S. Senator Prescott Bush

Primary results
The primary season was largely uneventful, as MacKay (D) and Bush (R) officially ran unopposed for their respective nominations. Initially the Democratic primary saw a three-way race between MacKay, Rick Dantzler and J. Keith Arnold, but the latter two dropped out of the race early on. Dantzler became MacKay's running mate for lieutenant governor, and Arnold ran for Education Commissioner instead.

The lack of competitiveness saw a very low turnout of just 16.6% of voters for the September 1 primary.

Democratic primary

Republican primary

General election
Jeb Bush enjoyed double-digit leads in polling through most of the campaign, and had a large fundraising advantage over MacKay. Bush attempted to revamp his image after appearing too hard-right during the 1994 race. Internal struggles amongst key Democratic constituencies, particularly the African-American community, hurt MacKay. MacKay and the Florida Democratic party drew the ire of the black community after state representative Willie Logan, poised to become the first black speaker of the Florida House, was ousted by party leaders. Logan endorsed Bush in the general election.

Meanwhile, after receiving only 5% of the African-American vote in 1994, Bush sought to connect to minorities, a group he admittedly ignored in 1994. Setting a tone of compassionate conservatism, and portraying himself as a "consensus-building pragmatist," he met with African American leaders, and reached out to Jews and Hispanics. He introduced his Mexican-born wife Columba on the campaign trail, and demonstrated his fluent bi-lingual abilities, particularly in South Florida. MacKay ran from behind for the entire race, and barely managed closed to gap to ten points in the days leading up to the general election.

On election day, Bush won by almost 11%. He garnered 61% of the Hispanic vote and 14% of the African American vote, a surprising showing for a Republican seeking statewide office. With his brother George W. Bush winning re-election in Texas, the two brothers became the first siblings to govern two states at the same time since Nelson and Winthrop Rockefeller governed New York and Arkansas from 1967 to 1971. Despite his strong statewide showing, Bush was unable to provide coattails for other Republicans further down the ticket. Charlie Crist was easily defeated in his Senate race, and House Republicans did not pick up any seats in the midterms. In the state legislature, the GOP netted no new Senate seats, and picked up only two seats in the House.

A little over a month after the election, Lawton Chiles died suddenly of a heart attack. Buddy MacKay, still the sitting lieutenant governor, was sworn in as the 42nd governor of Florida on December 13, 1998, and served out the final 23 days of Chiles' second term. In an ironic twist, MacKay managed to serve in the office he lost the race for, but stated "There's no great pleasure in this." MacKay oversaw the state funeral of Chiles, and made a handful of minor appointments, before Bush was sworn in as the 43rd Governor on January 5, 1999.

Results

Videos
(1) Midterm Election Coverage, which includes Bush's victory speech from November 3, 1998 

(2) Florida Gubernatorial Debate from October 20, 1998 

(3) Florida Gubernatorial Debate from October 3, 1998

References

1998
Florida
Gubernatorial
Jeb Bush